Javier 'Xavi' Fernández Annunziata (born 31 August 1987) is a Spanish former footballer who played as a left winger, and is the current manager of Caudal Deportivo.

Football career
Born in Santa Cruz de Tenerife, Tenerife, Canary Islands, Annunziata joined CA Osasuna in 2008 from CD Tenerife B, going on to spend three full seasons with the reserves in Segunda División B and scoring 12 goals in 30 matches in his last (30 starts). On 28 October 2010 he made his debut with the Navarrese's first team, in a 1–1 home draw against Deportivo de La Coruña for the Copa del Rey. On 15 January of the following he made his first La Liga appearance, playing eight minutes in a 2–4 away defeat to Villarreal CF; he renewed his contract on 1 June, extending his link until 2013 with the option for two further years.

On 28 August 2012, Annunziata was loaned to Segunda División club SD Huesca until the end of the campaign, which ended in relegation. Subsequently, he resumed his career in division three and lower.

Annunziata retired as a footballer in December 2019, and started his career as manager. Real Avilés was his last club as a player.

Managerial career
On 25 March 2021 was announced as a new manager of Caudal Deportivo.

References

External links

1987 births
Living people
Spanish people of Italian descent
Footballers from Santa Cruz de Tenerife
Spanish footballers
Association football wingers
La Liga players
Segunda División players
Segunda División B players
Tercera División players
CD Tenerife B players
CA Osasuna B players
CA Osasuna players
SD Huesca footballers
Real Oviedo players
UP Langreo footballers
Caudal Deportivo footballers
CF Villanovense players
Real Avilés CF footballers
Spanish football managers
Sportspeople of Italian descent